Víctor Bird (born March 16, 1982) is a volleyball player from Puerto Rico, who was a member of the Men's National Team that ended up in sixth place at the 2007 FIVB Men's World Cup in Japan. In the same year the allrounder won the silver medal at the NORCECA Championship in Anaheim.

He is currently playing in Israel for the Maccabi Ranana team.
In the season 2009 / 2010 Bird is playing for the Team Moerser SC in the first German league.

References
 FIVB Profile

1982 births
Living people
Puerto Rican men's volleyball players
Volleyball players at the 2007 Pan American Games
Place of birth missing (living people)
Pan American Games competitors for Puerto Rico